State (Bell/Springvale) Highway, also known as Bell Street/Springvale Road State Highway (after its longest constituent parts), is the longest self-contained urban highway in Melbourne, Australia, linking Tullamarine Freeway and Nepean Highway through Melbourne's north-eastern suburbs. These names are not widely known to most drivers, as the entire allocation is still best known as by the names of its constituent parts: Bell Street, Banksia Street, Manningham Road, Williamsons Road, Doncaster Road, Mitcham Road, Springvale Road and Edithvale Road. This article will deal with the entire length of the corridor for sake of completion, as well to avoid confusion between declarations.

Route

Bell Street (and the beginning of the north-western section of the highway) starts at the interchange with CityLink and heads east as a single-carriageway four-lane road to Sydney Road in Coburg, then as a dual-carriageway road varying between 4 and 6 lanes through Preston, then along Bell-Banksia Link to Banksia Street through Heidelberg to the Yarra River. As Manningham Road, it continues east past Bulleen Road (where the north-western section of the highway ends) through Bulleen to Doncaster, where it becomes Williamsons Road, then continues east along Doncaster and Mitcham Roads through Doncaster East. At the northern edge of Donvale it intersects with and changes name to Springvale Road, where it heads south over the Eastern Freeway/EastLink interchange (where the beginning of the south-eastern section of the highway starts) and continues south through Nunawading, Glen Waverley, Mulgrave, Springvale and Chelsea Heights, where it meets the Mornington Peninsula Freeway (and the south-eastern section of the highway ends). As Edithvale Road, it returns to a single-carriageway, two-lane road until it terminates at the Nepean Highway in Edithvale.

Throughout the 1980s and 1990s, the Doncaster Road section carried around 50,000 vehicles per hour at peak, but this number dropped in 1997 after the extension of the Eastern Freeway.

Many junctions with Tullamarine Freeway, Sydney Road, Eastern Freeway, Monash Freeway, Princes Highway, and Nepean Highway contribute to large traffic volumes along the corridor.

History
The Country Roads Board (later VicRoads) declared Bell Street a Main Road in August 1947, heading west from Main Heidelberg-Eltham Road (today Rosanna Road) along Burgundy and then Bell Streets in Heidelberg through Preston and Coburg to Moonee Ponds Creek at Pascoe Vale South. This was extended further west via a new bridge over Moonee Ponds Creek to connect directly to the Tullamarine Freeway extension when it opened in 1970 (plans to do so had existed since 1950).

The passing of the Country Roads Act of 1958 (itself an evolution from the original Highways and Vehicles Act of 1924) provided for the declaration of State Highways, roads two-thirds financed by the State government through the Country Roads Board. The road was declared a State Highway in June 1983, between Coburg and Edithvale (unusually referred to as "Unnamed" in reports at the time, but later named Bell Street/Springvale Road State Highway 3 years later), but was still sign-posted as its constituent parts. Work on the direct link between Bell and Banksia Streets (the "Bell-Banksia Link") in western Heidelberg, built to relieve traffic congestion and improve safety around the Burgundy Street shopping precinct, started in December 1988, and completed on 1 July 1992, at a total cost of $40 million.

Bell Street was signed as Metropolitan Route 40 between Pascoe Vale South and Heidelberg in 1965, heading south at its western end along Reynolds Parade and Woodland Street to reach Lancefield Road: this was re-routed via Tullamarine Freeway in 1970. Metropolitan Route 40 was later re-routed to run across the entire corridor to Edithvale in 1989, with an adjustment running from Burgundy, Jika and Dora Streets to the Bell-Banksia Link (and Banksia Street) through Heidelberg when it opened in 1992.

The passing of the Road Management Act 2004 granted the responsibility of overall management and development of Victoria's major arterial roads to VicRoads: in 2004, VicRoads re-declared the road as State (Bell/Springvale) Highway (Arterial #6400) in two sections: the north-western section between Hackett Street (just before the interchange with CityLink) in Pascoe Vale South and Bulleen Highway (Bulleen Road) in Bulleen; the south-eastern section between Eastern Freeway in Donvale and Mornington Peninsula Freeway in Chelsea Heights, while re-declaring the remaining roads within the corridor as Manningham Road  (Arterial #5221), Williamsons Road (Arterial #5225), Doncaster Road (Arterial #5805),  Mitcham Road (Arterial #5804), and the remnants of Springvale Road (including Edithvale Road) (Arterial #5797), with the former alignment along Burgundy Street declared as Bell Street Road (Arterial #5818).

Regardless of official declarations, all roads along the corridor are still presently known (and signposted) as their constituent parts.

1969 Melbourne Transportation Plan
The original 1969 Melbourne Transportation Plan showed the F4 Freeway following the Tullamarine Freeway, Bell and Banksia Streets, to Williamsons Road then joining the F7 Freeway heading south along the Middleborough Road and the Blackburn Road corridor to the F2 Freeway (Dingley Freeway) between Clayton and Westall Roads (rather than Springvale Road).

Level crossing removal
In January 2010, rail tracks in Nunawading were lowered below-ground as part of a level-crossing elimination project. A similar project was undertaken in Springvale in May 2014. Under the Level Crossing Removal Project, the level crossing at Edithvale was removed in November 2021 and the last level crossing was removed at Bell was removed in May 2022.

Major intersections

See also

 List of Melbourne highways

References

Highways and freeways in Melbourne
Streets in Melbourne
Transport in the City of Merri-bek
Transport in the City of Darebin
Transport in the City of Banyule
Transport in the City of Manningham
Transport in the City of Whitehorse
Transport in the City of Monash
Transport in the City of Greater Dandenong
Transport in the City of Kingston (Victoria)